Jilmil Jonak is a 2014 Indian Assamese language drama film starring Jatin Bora and Nishita Goswami in the lead roles. The film was directed by Sibanan Boruah and produced under the banner of Daijee Cine Productions by Daijee Gogoi and written by Horen Chandra Rajkhowa, released on 30 May 2014.

Plot 
Jilmil Jonak traces the life of a successful businessman based in Thailand. Aloof from his family for years, the story takes a twist when his past and family comes back to him.

Cast 
 Jatin Bora
 Nishita Goswami
 Nipon Goswami
 Raag Oinitam
 Ronin Gogoi
 Shyamontika Sharma
 Podmarag Goswami
 Akashdeep Deka
 Indraneil Sengupta
 Bikramaditya Gogoi
 Anamika Gogoi

Production 
Jilmil Jonak is the second Assamese feature film directed by Sibanan Boruah. Earlier Boruah directed Hiyar Dapunot Tumarei Chobi. The mahurut of the film was held on 30 May 2013 at Panjabari, Guwahati. Filming started at Guwahati, and later moved to Thailand. A couple of songs and dramatic sequences were filmed in Bangkok and Pattaya. This is the second Assamese film, after Ahir Bhairav, for which shooting took place outside of India. The budget of the film was approximated to be .

References

External links
 

2014 films
Films set in Assam
Films shot in Thailand
2010s Assamese-language films